The gridiron pendulum was a temperature-compensated clock pendulum invented by British clockmaker John Harrison around 1726 and later modified by John Ellicott. It was used in precision clocks. In ordinary clock pendulums, the pendulum rod expands and contracts with changes in temperature. The period of the pendulum's swing depends on its length, so a pendulum clock's rate varied with changes in ambient temperature, causing inaccurate timekeeping. The gridiron pendulum consists of alternating parallel rods of two metals with different thermal expansion coefficients, such as steel and brass. The rods are connected by a frame in such a way that their different thermal expansions (or contractions) compensate for each other, so that the overall length of the pendulum, and thus its period, stays constant with temperature.

The gridiron pendulum was used during the Industrial Revolution period in pendulum clocks, precision clocks employed as time standards in factories, laboratories, office buildings, and post offices to schedule work and set other clocks. The gridiron became so associated with accurate timekeeping that to this day many clocks have pendulums with decorative fake gridirons, which have no temperature compensating qualities.

How it works
Its simplest and later form consists of five rods. A central iron rod runs up from the bob to a point immediately below the suspension.

At that point a cross-piece (middle bridge) extends from the central rod and connects to two zinc rods, one on each side of the central rod, which reach down to, and are fixed to, the bottom bridge just above the bob. The bottom bridge clears the central rod and connects to two further iron rods which run back up to the top bridge attached to the suspension. As the iron rods expand in heat, the bottom bridge drops relative to the suspension, and the bob drops relative to the middle bridge. However, the middle bridge rises relative to the bottom one because the greater expansion of the zinc rods pushes the middle bridge, and therefore the bob, upward to match the combined drop caused by the expanding iron.

In simple terms, the upward expansion of the zinc counteracts the combined downward expansion of the iron (which has a greater total length). The rod lengths are calculated so that the effective length of the zinc rods multiplied by zinc's thermal expansion coefficient equals the effective length of the iron rods multiplied by iron's expansion coefficient, thereby keeping the pendulum the same length.

Harrison's original construction using brass (pure zinc not being available then) is more complex because brass does not expand as much as zinc does. A further set of rods and bridges is needed giving nine rods in all, five iron and four brass. The exact degree of compensation can be adjusted by having a section of the central rod which is partly brass and partly iron. These overlap (like a sandwich) and are joined by a pin which passes through both metals. A number of holes for the pin are made in both parts and moving the pin up or down the rod changes how much of the combined rod is brass and how much is iron. In the late 19th century the Dent company marketed a further development of the zinc gridiron in which the four outer rods were replaced by two concentric tubes which were linked by a tubular nut which could be screwed up and down to alter the degree of compensation.

Disadvantages
Scientists in the 1800s found that the gridiron pendulum had disadvantages that made it unsuitable for the highest-precision clocks. The friction of the rods sliding in the holes in the frame caused the rods to adjust to temperature changes in a series of tiny jumps, rather than with a smooth motion. This caused the rate of the pendulum, and therefore the clock, to change suddenly with each jump. Later it was found that zinc is not very stable dimensionally; it is subject to creep. Therefore, another type of temperature-compensated pendulum, the mercury pendulum, was used in the highest-precision clocks.

By 1900, the highest-precision astronomical regulator clocks used pendulum rods of low thermal expansion materials such as invar and fused quartz.

External links

Pendulums
English inventions